The 1901 Tennessee Volunteers football team was an American football team that represented the University of Tennessee as a member of the Southern Intercollegiate Athletic Association (SIAA) during the 1901 SIAA football season.  In its first and only season under head coach Gilbert Kelly (a former Princeton football player), Tennessee compiled a 3–3–2 record (1–1–2 against SIAA opponents). The team played its home games at Waite Field in Knoxville, Tennessee.

Schedule

References

Tennessee
Tennessee Volunteers football seasons
Tennessee Volunteers football